Prince Gaetan of the Two Sicilies, Count of Girgenti (12 January 1846, Naples, Two Sicilies – 26 November 1871, Lucerne, Switzerland) was the seventh child of Ferdinand II of the Two Sicilies and his wife Maria Theresa of Austria. Gaetan was a member of the House of Bourbon-Two Sicilies and consort to Isabella, Princess of Asturias, twice the recognized heir presumptive to the throne of Spain. Through this union, Gaetan was created an Infante of Spain.

Marriage and later life

Gaetan married Isabella, Princess of Asturias, eldest surviving child of Francis, Duke of Cádiz and Isabella II of Spain, on 13 May 1868 in Madrid. Gaetan was a first cousin to both of Isabella's parents. Their union was intended to end a feud between the Neapolitan Bourbons and the Spanish Bourbons following Spain's recognition of the Kingdom of Italy unified under the House of Savoy. The ceremony took place shortly before Spain's Glorious Revolution which brought an end to Isabella II's reign.

Gaetan and Isabella's marriage proved unhappy. For two years, Gaetan traveled throughout Europe visiting relatives in major cities including Vienna. A troubled and depressed man, Gaetan experienced weak health and epilepsy. He had unsuccessfully attempted suicide at least once before shooting himself in the head in his hotel room in Lucerne, Switzerland. Isabella returned to Spain in 1874 and did not remarry. Their brief union produced no issue.

In the course of his short life Cayetano pursued an active military career, including commissions in the Bourbon Neapolitan army and subsequently, in exile, as colonel of a regiment of lancers in Austria. He also saw service with the Papal army, fighting against Garibaldi at the Battle of Mentana, 1867. During the 1868 revolution against Queen Isabella II of Spain, the Prince, aged only 22, commanded the Pavia Hussars regiment and fought at the Battle of Alcolea.

Ancestry

References

1846 births
1871 deaths
1870s suicides
19th-century Roman Catholics
Burials in the Pantheon of Infantes at El Escorial
Counts of Girgenti
Italian Roman Catholics
Spanish infantes
Spanish Roman Catholics
19th-century Neapolitan people
People with epilepsy
Princes of Bourbon-Two Sicilies
Royalty and nobility with disabilities
Suicides by firearm in Switzerland
Knights of the Golden Fleece of Spain
Grand Crosses of the Order of Saint Stephen of Hungary
Monarchs of the Kingdom of the Two Sicilies
Sons of kings